"Ain't Safe" is a song by American rappers and singers Trippie Redd and Don Toliver. It was released on October 28, 2022 as the fourth single for the former's upcoming mixtape A Love Letter to You 5. The song peaked at number 92 on the Billboard Hot 100.

Composition
In regard to production, the song borrows "psychedelic trap and melodic song structures and verses" which is reminiscent of Don Toliver's music. Lyrically, the song focuses on the rappers keeping their guards up and emphasizes that their enemies are not safe from them. Toliver sings about being strapped with .40 S&W and taking OxyContin.

Critical reception
The song received generally positive reviews. Lexi Lane of Uproxx wrote that "the catchy production compliments each of the rapper's verses" and "By the song's outro instrumental, it feels reminiscent of floating through space." Gabriel Bras Nevares of HotNewHipHop wrote of the production, "It's nothing new at this point, but the graceful piano melodies and dense ad-libs make for a fun atmosphere to match the percussion. It's the type of beat that isn't hot on impact, with its bouncy bass hits and understated hi-hats and snares, but it works engagingly as a dreamy combo." In addition, he praised the collaboration of Trippie Redd and Don Toliver. In regard to Toliver's vocals, he wrote, "His voice is always a winner for tracks like these, especially when it's paired with a dynamic flow", while regarding Redd he wrote, "He expands on a lot of the same flexes and mindsets that Don started the track with, but with a more powerful vocal performance."

Music video
The music video premiered on November 2, 2022 and was directed by Nolan Riddle. It sees Trippie Redd and Don Toliver in a "trippy" landscape, where there are "otherworldly" plants and creatures.

Credits and personnel
 Trippie Redd – vocals, songwriting
 Don Toliver – vocals, songwriting
 Dave-O – production, songwriting
 Quincy Riley – production, songwriting
 2one2 – production, songwriting
 Tariq Beats – production, songwriting
 Igor Mamet – mastering, mixing, recording
 206Derek - mixing
 Koen Heldens - mixing

Charts

References

2022 singles
2022 songs
Trippie Redd songs
Don Toliver songs
Songs written by Trippie Redd
Songs written by Don Toliver